Garbha may refer to:

 Womb, or new life through pregnancy
 Garbha Superfast Express, a superfast train running between Gandhidham and Howrah Junction
 Garbhagriha, the small unit shrine of a Hindu temple

See also 
 Garba (disambiguation)